Elections to Calderdale Metropolitan Borough Council were held on 2 May 2002.  One third of the council was up for election and the Conservative Party lost overall control of the council to no overall control. The total turnout of the election was 32.16% (47,091 voters of an electorate of 146,407). The winning candidate in each ward is highlighted in bold.

After the election, the composition of the council was
Conservative 25
Liberal Democrats 15
Labour 13
Independent 1

Ward results

Brighouse ward

Calder Valley ward

Elland ward

Greetland and Stainland ward

Hipperholme and Lightcliffe ward

Illingworth ward

Luddendenfoot ward

Mixenden ward

Northowram and Shelf ward

Ovenden ward

Rastrick ward

Ryburn ward

St John's ward

Skircoat ward

Sowerby Bridge ward

Todmorden ward

Town ward

Warley ward

By-elections between 2002 and 2003

Calder Valley ward, 2002

Mixenden ward, 2003
This by-election has become synonymous as an example of a likely Condorcet loser winning.

Rastrick ward, 2003

References 

2002
2002 English local elections
2000s in West Yorkshire